Safi Landmark Hotel is a four star hotel, in Kabul, Afghanistan. It was opened in 2005 with the attached Kabul City Center mall.

The hotel has nine floors and contains 90 rooms, according to SnapTravel.

The Safi Landmark hotel is located in downtown Kabul near governmental offices, ministries, UN and embassies. It is approximately 15 minutes by road from Kabul International Airport.

Incidents
The hotel was near the site of a suicide attack on February 26, 2010 that killed 17 people, to which the Taliban spokesman Zabiullah Mujahid claimed the group's responsibility. The hotel was targeted again in another suicide bombing on February 14, 2011 at its entrance, killing three guards. The hotel was at the time frequented by foreigners.

References

External links
Official Safi Landmark Hotel website

Hotels in Kabul
Hotels established in 2005
2005 establishments in Afghanistan